Alain Celo (born 1960) is a French composer and violist with the .

He has written about twenty works, mainly instrumental. He was awarded the SACEM Prize, and also received advice from Claude Lefebvre and George Crumb. His influences range from Debussy and Stravinsky to Ligeti, through jazz and ethnic music. His pieces most often feature the relationship between man and nature (from Oiseaux imaginaires pour piano in 1993 to Espaces désertiques for flute, violin, double bass and percussion in 2003) or are directly related to literary works (Commentaires sur Verlaine for viola, piano and narrator, 1996, Erlkönig after Goethe for voices and strings, 2001).

His works have been performed by the Stravinsky ensemble, the Cergy-Pontoise Studio, Symblêma, Souffle d’ébène.

References

External links 
 Official website
 Le mouton à cinq pattes composition by Alain Celo (YouTube)

1960 births
Living people
People from Neuilly-sur-Seine
French classical violists
20th-century French composers
21st-century composers
French male composers
École Normale de Musique de Paris alumni
20th-century French male musicians
21st-century French male musicians
20th-century violists
21st-century violists